Luojiang District is a district of Sichuan Province, China. It is under the administration of Deyang city.

Climate

References

Districts of Sichuan
Deyang